Claude Eugène Chauchouart de Lavicomté ( — Hector, Battle of the Saintes,  12 April 1782) was a French Navy officer. He served in the War of American Independence.

Biography 
Lavicomté was born at Saint-Malo. He joined the Navy as a Garde-Marine on 11 June 1748. He was promoted to Lieutenant on 15 January 1762, and to Captain on 10 May 1777.

He was killed at the Battle of the Saintes on 12 April 1782.

Sources and references 
 Notes

Citations

References
 
 

External links
 

French Navy officers
French military personnel of the American Revolutionary War